73 Motorised Brigade was a Formation of 7th Infantry Division (South Africa), a combined arms force consisting of infantry, armour and artillery.

History

Origin

19 Brigade
71 Brigade can trace its origins back to a structure in the late 1960s, called 19 Brigade, which was headquartered at the Witwatersrand Command Complex.
On 1 August 1974, through a reorganization of the Army’s conventional force, the name was changed to 73 Motorised Brigade.

Initial Structure
Under this reorganisation, the following units were transferred from Witwatersrand Command to the new command:
Witwatersrand Rifles,
Regiment Oos Rand,
Pretoria Highlanders,
Regiment Vrystaat,
18 Field Squadron,
73 Signal Squadron,
10 Maintenance Unit,
29 Field Workshop and
a Field Ambulance.

Higher Command
73 Motorised Brigade initially resorted under the Chief of the Army until July 1986 but was then transferred to 7 Division. Eventually the entire Brigade resorted under Far North Command.

Brigade Training and Exercises 
73 Motorised Brigade would generally make use of the General de Wet Training Range, Tempe, near Bloemfontein. Notably 73 Motorised Brigade was involved in Exercise Thunder Chariot, a Divisional exercise held since 1956, at the Army Battle School. Other exercises included:
Exercise Aggressor 1
Exercise Turning Wheel
Exercise Excalibur
Exercise Ysbeer both on Lohatla

Operational Activation
As a Citizen Force structure, 73 Motorised Brigade would make use of call-up orders for its personnel to generally report for 3 months service. Headquarters staff would then leave for Tempe near Bloemfontein, where a transfer camp would be established to process troops en route to the operational area in northern South West Africa. Processing of units would include personal documentation, a medical examination, inoculation and the issuing of equipment and weapons. Each unit on completion of the necessary processing, would entrain to the Olienhoutplaat Station for a six-day journey to Grootfontein, the railhead near the Operational Area.

Changes over time
73 Motorised Brigade structure was not static, units were substituted as needs were adapted to Two units arrived in 73 Brigade in 1984, namely Rand Light Infantry and 7 Medium Regiment. By 1986 7 Medium Regiment was transferred under direct control of 7 Division but Regiment Uitenhage was transferred in. In 1989 Rand Light Infantry was transferred to Far North Command while the Pretoria Highlanders was added to the Brigade.

From a Conventional Brigade to a COIN Brigade
With the independence of Namibia, the conventional threat dissipated and the Army Command began a process of rationalisation. Brigade headquarters were now focussed on counter-insurgency support to regional commands.

Insignia

Leadership 
Brigadier E.L. Bekker 1974
Colonel J.S. van Heerden 1974-1975
Colonel T. Hanekom 1976-1977
Colonel Y. de Bruin 1978-1980
Colonel J.H.E. Aveling 1981-1983
Colonel D.M. Nel 1984-1987
Colonel B. van Heerden 1990

See also

Notes

References

External links

Brigades of South Africa
Disbanded military units and formations in Johannesburg
Military units and formations established in 1974
Military units and formations of South Africa in the Border War
Military units and formations disestablished in 1992